Pedro Cuni-Bravo is a Spanish artist living in New York City, specializing in murals, portraits and encaustic and oil paintings. He teaches in Parsons School of Design and the Cooper Union.

Frescoes 

 New York City University, Trenton, State Government Building
 St. James Theatre

References

External links
 The Official Pedro Cuni-Bravo Website
 

Living people
Year of birth missing (living people)